Mac Nease Baseball Park at Russ Chandler Stadium is a college baseball stadium in Atlanta, Georgia.  It has been the home field of the Georgia Tech Yellow Jackets college baseball team since 1930. The current stadium opened in 2002.

History

Rose Bowl Field 
The original stadium was built in 1930, using the payoff from the football team's participation in the 1929 Rose Bowl.  The entire complex, which included three football practice fields, was named Rose Bowl Field.  The complex stood behind a stone wall along 5th and Fowler streets.

In 1971, the permanent grandstand was torn down to make way for the extension of 5th Street.  Lights were added in 1983.

Original stadium 
The stadium existed with only bleacher seats until 1985, when A. Russell Chandler, III (BSIE '67) funded construction of a new grandstand that opened in time for Tech's centennial year. Fans of Georgia Tech baseball affectionately called it "The Rusty C" due to its extensive use of aluminum as a construction material.

Current stadium 
The stadium was completely rebuilt in 2002. The new stadium features more brick and less aluminum in its construction materials than the previous one, but "Beesball" fans still affectionately refer to it as "The Rusty C." The stadium is located on the Georgia Tech campus in the heart of Atlanta's midtown area and offers fantastic views of the Atlanta skyline. On April 9, 2008, the stadium set an attendance record of 4,609 for the Yellow Jackets versus the Georgia Bulldogs game held that night. The crowd totally eclipsed previous marks for both post-season (4,468 vs. Southern California on June 2, 2000) and regular-season games (4,264 vs. Georgia on March 27, 2002). One ranking of college baseball stadium experiences ranks it three 

In 2020 the stadium was renovated again with a new facility called Champions Hall, as well as updated premium seating areas.  The venue was renamed Mac Nease Baseball Park at Russ Chandler Stadium.

Description

Field 
Field Dimensions:
Left Field: either 328 or 329 feet (~100m), depending on whether you believe the official media guide or the foul line post.
Left Center: 391 feet (119 m)
Center Field: 400 feet (122 m)
Right Center: 353 feet (108 m)
Right Field: 334 feet (102 m)

Due to the asymmetric shape of the field, the deepest point is actually 409 feet and lies just to the left of center field.

The fence height is a uniform 10 feet.

Seating 
Seating capacity: 4,157

This figure includes 1,100 chairback seats (mostly behind home plate, but also the front rows along the first and third baselines and several "open-air" skybox areas) and over 3,000 bleacher seats. There is room for additional expansion of the bleacher sections along the third base line that will bring the total seating capacity to over 5,000 seats, and there is ample spectator room adjacent to the bullpen along the first base line.

In 2013, the Yellow Jackets ranked 42nd among Division I baseball programs in attendance, averaging 1,525 per home game.

Facilities and features 
The facility has a clubhouse and locker room, training area and team rooms, indoor and outdoor hitting cages, press box, lights for night play, bench and stadium chair seating, suites, entry plaza, concessions and restrooms.

Parking 
There are no dedicated parking facilities for Russ Chandler Stadium. Recommended surface lots on the Georgia Tech campus in the vicinity of the stadium include the adjacent Klaus College of Computing Parking Deck, Peters Parking Deck, and the McCamish Pavilion lot. Limited street parking may be available on campus, but those parking along Fowler Street past the right field fence and wall could be subject to damage from long home runs. The O'Keefe lot and others nearby (Architecture and Van Leer Electrical Engineering lots) are no longer available due to construction or other campus projects. Consult The Georgia Tech Athletic Association, Rusty C, or Beesball.com website links provided in the "External links" section below for maps and more detailed information on recommended parking.

See also
 List of NCAA Division I baseball venues

References

External links 

The Rusty C, a fansite maintained by the fans in Section 10 of Russ Chandler Stadium.
Beesball.com, a very popular fansite with extensive information on the Georgia Tech Baseball program.
Official Georgia Tech Baseball website
Georgia Tech Campus Parking Map

College baseball venues in the United States
Sports venues in Atlanta
Georgia Tech buildings and structures
Georgia Tech Yellow Jackets baseball
Baseball venues in Georgia (U.S. state)
1930 establishments in Georgia (U.S. state)
Sports venues completed in 1930